Afiea Nusrat Barsha, known as Barsha, is a Bangladeshi actress. Starting her career as a model, she made her feature film debut in Iftakar Chowdhury's 2010 film Khoj: The Search with another newcomer Ananta Jalil. She had roles in the films Khoj: The Search, Hridoy Bhanga Dheu and Most Welcome. She starring most expensive Bangladeshi Film Din–The Day was released on July 10, 2022.

Background
Barsha was born as Khadiza Parvin Barsha in Shahzadpur, Sirajganj, Bangladesh.

Personal life
Barsha is married to Ananta Jalil since 2011. Together they have two sons, Ariz Ibn Jalil and Abrar Ibn Jalil

Filmography

Awards and nominations

References

External links
 

Living people
People from Sirajganj District
Bangladeshi film actresses
21st-century Bangladeshi actresses
Year of birth missing (living people)